Ana Rodrigues (born 21 April 1994 in Sao Joao da Madeira) is a Portuguese swimmer. She is competing for Portugal at the 2012 Summer Olympics.

References

Portuguese female swimmers
Swimmers at the 2012 Summer Olympics
Olympic swimmers of Portugal
1994 births
Living people
Swimmers at the 2010 Summer Youth Olympics
Portuguese female breaststroke swimmers
Portuguese female freestyle swimmers
20th-century Portuguese women
21st-century Portuguese women
Mediterranean Games medalists in swimming
Mediterranean Games silver medalists for Portugal
Swimmers at the 2022 Mediterranean Games